Satirical music describes music that employs satire or was described as such. It deals with themes of social, political, religious, cultural structures and provides commentary or criticism on them typically under the guise of dark humor or respective music genres. Topics include sexuality, race, culture, religion, politics,  institutions, taboo subjects, morality, and the human condition.

History
Satirical route in music has been explored countless times; from premodern ballads such as the 4th-century BCE  Song of Songs to classical, avant-garde, and modern  popular music. Such examples are:
Classical
Satirical ballets, operas, ballads, and plays include Le Bourgeois gentilhomme , Il Girello  by Alessandro Melani, L'Europe galante ,  Poly , Le carnaval des revues  by Jacques Offenbach,  La belle Hélène , Ariadne auf Naxos , third movement of Lieder eines fahrenden Gesellen , Die Dreigroschenoper , Neues vom Tage , L'amour des trois oranges , The Rake's Progress , 17th-century composer Molière,  and 20th-century composer György Ligeti. 

Popular
American folk singer Bob Dylan,  soul musician Gil Scott-Heron , humorist and rock musician Frank Zappa , surreal funk musicians George Clinton  and Parliament Funkadelic, hardcore punk band Dead Kennedys  grindcore band Anal Cunt , and punk rock band The Kominas . 
Avant-garde
Musicians that combined  satire and avant-garde include Throbbing Gristle , Negativland , Culturcide , and the so-called Americana absurdum movement comprising monks , The Residents  especially their albums The Residents Present the Third Reich and Roll (1976) and Commercial Album (1980), DEVO , and Talking Heads .  Another example is a digital hardcore album Alec Empire vs. Elvis Presley (1998).

Satire in counterculture
Counterculture and avant-garde music scenes characterized by being "aggressive in sound, challenging in content"  that spawned popular music such as hip hop and heavy metal display  satirical taboo transgressions.

According to British sociologist Keith Kahn-Harris, "tongue-in-cheek attitude" and irony has been a fundamental "part of the UK extreme scene" by often adopting camp and comic elements to transgress what outsiders to the scene find "acceptable;" e.g. appropriating Holocaust imagery to  advance a position pertaining to abortion or animal rights. Other times, like in  the case of black metal, exaggerating tropes and behaviors within music cultures  or society. In hip-hop culture, especially gangsta rap and 1990s rappers like Missy Elliot, transgressive humor of rap "revolve[s] around the established movements of gangsta realism and progressive Afrocentrism" to the point of exaggerated albeit critical self-deprecation.

Vaporwave, an Internet music genre, samples corporate video work, old advertising jingles, and music of the so-called economic boom period of the 1980s like smooth jazz or contemporary R&B, and distorts them to produce a sort of repetitious slowed-down, pitch-shifted, intentionally low-fi music that was praised as a commentary on "corporate cultures of capitalism" or consumerism for its ambivalent satirical musical tone. One of vaporwave albums utilizing satire is James Ferraro's album FARSIDEVIRTUAL (2011).

Satire in popular music
Ambiguity of satire has contributed to popular misinterpretations of music that adopted it. For instance,  Bruce Springsteen's "Born in the U.S.A." (1984) listed in Rolling Stones "The 500 Greatest Songs of All Time" and RIAA's Songs of the Century was written as a satire yet canonized as a "patriotic rock anthem," a designation  that ignores the message "how far political leaders had strayed from the values the country was founded on,"  criticizing the establishment with the memorable chorus. As  Springsteen adds, it is about the working-class man going through

Popular satires

Parody

Parody music in the truest sense is a type of work that seriously imitates a well-known original and  simultaneously covertly satirizes the environment of which that original is a part (compare, pastiche which does not  perform the latter and is conflated with "homages") while at worst is copying an original composition for a "parodic effect" only.

Comedic satire

Overtly comedic strains of satire include comedy and novelty music, typically focused on  broad-appeal jokes and caricatures. Both arriving with popular music in the 1940s and 1950s, comical spoofs of music genres and performers contributed to a popular mainstream strain of satire.

Stan Freberg's satirical contribution was "Green Chri$tma$" (1959)  which targeted and offended advertisers but he was not against  advertising and personally created an effective Coca-Cola campaign himself. Popular satirical comedian Weird Al Yankovic contributed with "Frank's 2000 TV" (1992)—song about a love/hate  relationship with pop culture and technology and "Young, Dumb & Ugly" (1993)—song about snotty outlaw posturing. California punk band The Offspring expressed a humorous satire style in "Come Out and Play" (1994)—song about  teenage gang violence and "Pretty Fly (For a White Guy)" (1998)—song about 1990s poor youth posturing adopted by an upper-class young suburbanite.
 
On the other hand, Tom Lehrer is known for his style of comic morbid juxtapositions and satirical culture  criticisms, e.g. "Poisoning Pigeons in the Park" pairs inoffensive melody with Charles Addams-esque lyrics:

Meanwhile, "My Home Town" catalogues prostitution, pornography, murder, arson among common people using a  nostalgic tone.  Lehrer's humorous music with social and political satire overtones attracted  censorship and negative press which he reprinted on the sleeve of his albums. By word-of-mouth reputation he sold 370,000 copies by the end of the 1950s and developed a following in Australia, Denmark,  and England. Lehrer contributed with "The Folk Song Army," "National Brotherhood Week," "I  Wanna Go Back to Dixie," "So Long, Mom (I'm Off to Drop the Bomb," and "We Will All Go Together When We Go" which examine society and the failings of both left- and right-wing.

Randy Newman, an Americana-themed humorist, fused old time-style music with sardonic off-color lyrics and has contributed to satire with 12 Songs (1970), Sail Away (1972), and Good Old Boys (1974). Newman's song "Rednecks" (1974), banned in Boston, Massachusetts and its airplay restricted for containing the word 'nigger', starts as a stereotypical depiction of "racist rednecks" from the South and ends up illustrating less overt racism in the Northern United States:

Notes

References

Works cited 
 

M
Music and politics
Musicology